Borenstein is a surname and may refer to:

Benjamin A. Borenstein (died 2006), American food scientist.
Johann Borenstein, Israeli roboticist and Professor.
Joyce Borenstein (born 1950), Canadian director and animator.
Larry Borenstein (1919–1981), American property owner and art dealer.
Max Borenstein, American film writer and director.
Nimrod Borenstein (born 1969), British-French-Israeli composer.
Nathaniel Borenstein (born 1957), American computer scientist. 
Sam Borenstein (1908–1969), Canadian painter. 
Zach Borenstein (born 1990), American professional baseball outfielder.